Paraskevas Tselios (born , in Alexandroupoli) is a Greek male volleyball player who plays as a middle blocker. He is a member of the Greece men's national volleyball team and was part of the Greek team that competed at the 2017 FIVB Volleyball World League.

At club level he currently plays for Olympiacos.

References

External links
 profile at greekvolley.gr

1997 births
Living people
Greek men's volleyball players
Olympiacos S.C. players
Sportspeople from Alexandroupolis